Albert Turner Bharucha-Reid (November 13, 1927 February 26, 1985) was an American mathematician and theorist who worked extensively on probability theory, Markov chains, and statistics. The author of more than 70 papers and 6 books, his work touched on such diverse fields as economics, physics, and biology.

Life
Bharucha-Reid was born Albert Turner Reid, the son of William Thaddeus Reid and Mae Marie Beamon Reid of Hampton, Virginia. He studied math and biology at Iowa State University, where completed a BS in 1949. He continued his studies at the University of Chicago from 1950 to 1953, where he began to focus more intensely on statistics and probability. He published eight papers during his time at the University of Chicago, but he did not finish his PhD dissertation because he felt it was a waste of time. In 1954, he married Rodabe Phiroze Bharucha, and he legally changed his name to Albert Turner Bharucha-Reid. He had two children, Kurush Feroze Bharucha-Reid, and Rustam William Bharucha-Reid.

Work
Bharucha-Reid published his first paper, a work on mathematical biology, when he was only 18 years old. He went on to teach and lecture in the United States, Europe, and India. He held professorships or research positions at Columbia University, the University of California, Berkeley, the University of Oregon, Wayne State University, the Polish Academy of Sciences, and Atlanta University. In particular, in 1970 he was appointed Dean of the School of Arts and Sciences at Wayne State University.

Legacy
A lecture series has been named in his honor by the National Association of Mathematicians.

Selected publications
Bharucha-Reid is the author or coauthor of:
Elements of the Theory of Markov Processes and Their Application (McGraw Hill, 1960; Dover, 1997)
Random Integral Equations (Academic Press, 1972)
Random Polynomials (with M. Sambandham, Academic Press, 1986)

He is also the editor of:
Probabilistic Methods in Applied Mathematics (edited, Academic Press, Vol. I, 1968; Vol. II, 1970)
Probabilistic Analysis and Related Topics (edited, Academic Press, Vol. I, 1978; Vol. II, 1979; Vol. III, 1983)
Approximate Solution of Random Equations (North-Holland, 1979)

References

1927 births
1985 deaths
African-American mathematicians
African-American scientists
20th-century American mathematicians
American statisticians
Clark Atlanta University faculty
Iowa State University alumni
People from Hampton, Virginia
Probability theorists
University of Chicago alumni
University of Oregon faculty
Wayne State University faculty
University of California, Berkeley faculty
Academics from Virginia
Mathematicians from Virginia
African-American statisticians
20th-century African-American people